Conciliar may refer to:
Conciliarity, conciliar authority
Conciliarism, a movement in Roman Catholicism emphasising conciliarity